is a Japanese manga series written and illustrated by Shōji Satō. It has been serialized in Fujimi Shobo's shōnen manga magazine Monthly Dragon Age since 2009 and collected in 26 tankōbon volumes so far, as of February 2023. Yen Press publishes the manga in North America and has released 24 volumes as of January 17, 2023. There was also a Special volume released, entitled "Triage X Tribute" with little side stories about the Triage X main character cast drawn by friends and assistants of Shōji Satō to honor his work. A 10-episode anime television series adaptation by Xebec was broadcast on Tokyo MX from April 8, 2015 to June 10, 2015. An anime OVA episode was bundled in the release of the series' twelfth volume in November 2015. In May 2015, Sentai Filmworks licensed Triage X for an English-language release in North America, while Animatsu Entertainment licensed the series for release in the United Kingdom.

Plot
Behind the exterior of Mochizuki General Hospital resides the vigilante organization known as "Black Label". The team, made up of select hospital staff and local teenagers from nearby Mochizuki High School, task themselves with killing undesirable people, dubbed "cancers" of society, and to stop their spread of infection into society.

Characters

The main male protagonist. A handsome but socially awkward high school student that belongs to the Black Label Organization, a vigilante group that deals with criminals the police are unable to. When he was young, he was severely scarred on a terrorist attack that took the life of his best friend, Ryu Mochizuki and he received organ transplants from him. During missions, he wears a bullet-proof motorbike helmet that covers his entire face.

The main female protagonist. Arashi's partner and senior at high school. While at school she acts calm and proper, she's really short-tempered and foul-mouthed, especially towards Arashi. She belonged to the Yakuza Kiba family, and her older brother Yuki tried to change it from the inside, which led him being killed on an arranged motorcycle accident, and she also got critically injured in said accident. She was saved by the Mochizuki Hospital staff, which led her eventually joining the Black Label. She starts to develop feelings for Arashi.

A 14-year old middle schooler, idol and demolitions expert of the Black Label. She's a genius who started college when she was 11, but she can also be really childish and enjoys giving nicknames to her teammates. She lives at an abandoned mansion filled with explosive traps.

The main nurse at Mochizuki General Hospital. She's the close combat expert of Black Label, handling mini guns and light machine guns with ease. She's also incredibly strong and has a good memory. While normally nice and laid back, on a mission, she wears a devil mask and armored gauntlets and turns berserk, showing her more brutal and sadistic side. She also develops feelings for Arashi later on in the series.

One of the head doctors at Mochizuki General Hospital. A kind and incredibly well-endowed woman, who is also a master swordsman. Whenever she wields her katana, her hair turns white, and it's so sharp it can cut through metal.

Anesthesiologist at Mochizuki General Hospital, Mikoto's mentor and Yuuko's childhood friend. She's the expert chemist and sniper of the Black Label, and tends to be the voice of reason in her team. She invented an anesthesia that works as a truth serum and the patient doesn't remember anything afterwards.

The Chairman of Mochizuki General Hospital and founder of the Black Label organization. His son, Ryu Mochizuki, was Arashi's best friend, and after the terrorist attack, he was forced to declare his own son dead. He's now terminally ill and in a wheelchair.

The director of Mochizuki General Hospital and a member of the Black Label. She specializes in gathering information for missions.

An assassin from a different organization, specializing in burning to death her targets. She befriends Mikoto (without either knowing the other works as a vigilante) when they become classmates. Her parents where killed in the same terrorist attack that scarred Arashi, and her younger sister died in a house fire that left her a severe burn scar.

A dedicated but easily angered detective who is constantly in pursuit of Black Label, even though he has been saved by them on two occasions.

A new detective in Tobioka Police Force and Tatara's partner, who is constantly dragged in his searches for Black Label. She's nearly as well endowed as Yuko.

Arashi's classmate who develops a crush on him. She's unaware of her classmates activities as vigilantes. She works as a waitress at her father's café and is a big fan of Oriha.

Hinako's best friend and Arashi's classmate. While at first she was weary of Arashi, after some time they become friends. She's also unaware of Black Label. She works several part-time jobs to maintain her younger brothers. She seems to develop some feelings for Mikoto later on.

A member of Syringe in charge of close quarters combat alongside her twin sister Kaori.

A member of Syringe in charge of close quarters combat alongside her twin sister Kaoru. She's more serious and focused than her twin.

D

A masked man in a balaclava.

Mr. Astro

A masked man who provides muscle for the group.

The leader of Syringe.

The sadistic son of the head of the highly influential Tobishiro Clan, who is interested in acquiring the drug known as Platinum Lily.

A sadomasochistic ninja woman who serves Tobishiro.

A doctor from another organization and a former member of Black Label. He's the one who trained Arashi.

An idol and Sumire's older twin sister. She knows some karate moves.

An idol and Haron's younger twin sister. She's more endowed than Haron.

Media

Manga

|}

Anime

Episode list

References

External links
Anime official website 

Anime series based on manga
Fujimi Shobo manga
IG Port franchises
Kadokawa Dwango franchises
Sentai Filmworks
Shōnen manga
Terrorism in fiction
Xebec (studio)
Yen Press titles